Nuestra Señora de la Vega is a town in the province of Burgos, Autonomous community of Castilla y León (Spain), region of Sierra de la Demanda, judicial district of Salas de los Infantes, Valdelaguna Valley City Council.

Towns in Spain